Qaleh Hamid may refer to:
 Qaleh Hamid, Khuzestan
 Qaleh Hamid, North Khorasan